Ross S. Plasterer (born 1935) is a retired major general in the United States Marine Corps who served as commanding general of the 1st Marine Aircraft Wing. He grew up in Lebanon, Pennsylvania.

References

1950 births
Living people
United States Marine Corps generals